, SpaceX operates four launch facilities: Cape Canaveral Space Launch Complex 40 (SLC-40), Vandenberg Space Force Base Space Launch Complex 4E (SLC-4E), Kennedy Space Center Launch Complex 39A (LC-39A), and Brownsville South Texas Launch Site. Space Launch Complex 40 was damaged in the AMOS-6 accident in September 2016 and repair work was completed by December 2017. SpaceX believes that they can optimize their launch operations, and reduce launch costs, by dividing their launch missions amongst these four launch facilities: LC-39A for NASA launches, SLC-40 for United States Space Force national security launches, SLC-4E for polar launches, and South Texas Launch Site for commercial launches.

COO Gwynne Shotwell stated in 2014 that "we are expanding in all of our locations" and "you will end up seeing a lot of SpaceX launch sites in order to meet the future demand that we anticipate." , SpaceX discussed preliminary plans to launch an average of 90 rockets per year after 2019. SpaceX have indicated that, depending on market demand, they may actually need another commercial launch site in addition to the Texas location.

In 2016, SpaceX signed a five-year lease to use a  former Spacehab building at Port Canaveral. A new building nearby is also planned, and these facilities would be used to refurbish rockets.

In addition, SpaceX uses a suborbital test facility, the SpaceX Rocket Development and Test Facility in McGregor, Texas. A high-altitude suborbital test facility was under construction in New Mexico, but was abandoned following the switch to flight tests on commercial missions.

SpaceX has indicated that they see a niche for each of the four orbital facilities currently in use or under construction, and that they have sufficient launch business to fill each pad, particularly so by the end of the decade if SpaceX business remains strong.

Cape Canaveral Space Force Station 

In 2007, the US Air Force leased Cape Canaveral Space Launch Complex 40 to SpaceX to launch the Falcon 9 rocket. During April 2008, construction started on the ground facilities necessary to support the launch of the SpaceX Falcon 9 rocket. Renovations included installation of new liquid oxygen and kerosene tanks and construction of a hangar for rocket and payload preparation.

The first Falcon 9 rocket arrived at SLC-40 in late 2008, and was first erected on January 10, 2009. It successfully reached orbit on its maiden launch on June 4, 2010, carrying a dummy payload qualification unit. SpaceX modified the launch pad in 2013 in order to support launches of the Falcon 9 v1.1 launch vehicle, a 60 percent heavier rocket with 60 percent more thrust on realigned engines and 60 percent longer fuel tank than the v1.0 version of the Falcon 9, requiring a modified transporter/erector.

In September 2016, the pad was damaged when a Falcon 9 rocket exploded during liquid oxygen loading in preparation for a hot-fire test. The pad was repaired and used for the first time since the explosion in the SpaceX CRS-13 mission in December 2017.

Kennedy Space Center 

In December 2013, NASA and SpaceX were in negotiations for SpaceX to lease Kennedy Space Center Launch Complex 39A, after SpaceX was selected in a multi-company bid process, following NASA's decision in early 2013 to lease the unused complex out as part of a bid to reduce annual operation and maintenance costs of unused government facilities. The SpaceX bid was for exclusive use of the launch complex to support their future crewed missions, but SpaceX said in September 2013 that they are also willing to support a multi-user arrangement for LC-39A, and they reiterated that position in December 2013.

A competing bid for commercial use of the launch complex was submitted by Jeff Bezos' Blue Origin, who bid for a shared non-exclusive use of the complex such that the launchpad can interface with multiple vehicles, and costs of pad operational expenses could be shared over the long term. One potential shared user in the Blue Origin notional plan was with United Launch Alliance. In September 2013—prior to completion of the bid period, and prior to any public announcement by NASA of the results of the process—Blue Origin filed a protest with the U.S. General Accounting Office (GAO) over what it said was "a plan by NASA to award an exclusive commercial lease to SpaceX for use of mothballed space shuttle launch LC-39A." NASA planned to complete the bid award and have the pad transferred by October 1, 2013, but the protest delayed a decision until after the GAO resolved the protest. Following the eruption of the controversy, on September 21, SpaceX said that they were willing to support a multi-user arrangement for LC-39A. In December 2013, the GAO denied the protest and sided with NASA, which argued that the solicitation contains no preference on the use of the facility as multi-use or single-use. "The [solicitation] document merely asks bidders to explain their reasons for selecting one approach instead of the other and how they would manage the facility."

SpaceX began architectural and engineering design work on the pad modifications in 2013, and signed the contractual documents to lease the pad for 20 years from NASA in April 2014. SpaceX is building a large Horizontal Integration Facility (HIF) just outside the perimeter of the existing launch pad in order to "house the Falcon [rockets] and associated hardware and payloads during processing." This is a marked difference from the vertical integration facility used by previous US government rockets that used the launch pad (Apollo Program and the Space Shuttle)—plus the installation of all new instrumentation and control systems, with substantial new plumbing for a variety of rocket liquids and gasses.

The Falcon rockets will be transported from the HIF to the launch pad aboard a Transporter Erector (TE) which will ride on rails up the former crawlerway path. In February 2016, it was reported that the pad was completed and activated indicating it is ready for launches of Falcon 9 Full Thrust. The first SpaceX launch from LC-39A occurred in February 2017, followed by a successful first-stage landing at Landing Zone 1. Further work was needed to support Falcon Heavy and crewed launches took over 60 days and occurred after Cape Canaveral LC-40 reopened. Demo-2, SpaceX's first crewed space mission launched from the Kennedy LC-39A launch pad in May 2020.

Future support 
The SpaceX Starship was initially deemed too large to launch from any existing SpaceX facility. In 2014, SpaceX indicated that the historic Florida launchpad LC-39A would not be large enough, and they planned to build a new site to accommodate the  rocket. In his September 2016 presentation, Elon Musk stated that the large launch vehicle would indeed be launched from LC-39A. However, SpaceX instead opted to build their South Texas Launch Site for exclusive use by Starship.

Vandenberg Space Force Base 

SpaceX currently operates a West Coast launch site located at Vandenberg Space Force Base Space Launch Complex 4 in order to deliver satellites to polar or Sun-synchronous orbits with Falcon 9 and Falcon Heavy launches.

SpaceX broke ground at Vandenberg in July 2011. A 2011 estimate showed that the project was expected to cost between $20 to $30 million for the first 24 months of construction and operation; thereafter, operational costs were expected to be $5–10 million per year. The sixth flight of the Falcon 9 launch vehicle launched in September 2013, which was the maiden flight of Falcon 9 v1.1. The site was used for a second time in January 2016 for the Jason-3 launch (which was the last flight of Falcon 9 v1.1) and for a third time in January 2017 for the first of the Iridium Next launches.

Other launch pads 

SpaceX originally intended to launch their first launch vehicle, the Falcon 1, from Space Launch Complex 3 West (SLC-3W) at Vandenberg Space Force Base. SLC-3W was modified by SpaceX to support the Falcon 1, and the Falcon 1 was erected on the pad in 2005. Problems arose when SpaceX was unable to obtain sufficient launch window availability because the pad would overfly other Air Force pads that were frequently left occupied for weeks or months at a time, thus severely restricting SpaceX launches. Ultimately, this launch pad was never used for orbital launch, although it was used for a number of ground tests.

SpaceX proceeded to then build a launch facility in the northern Pacific Ocean at the Ronald Reagan Ballistic Missile Defense Test Site, on Omelek Island, a part of the Kwajalein Atoll, Marshall Islands. SpaceX began launching Falcon 1 rockets from Omelek in 2006. Falcon 1 Flight 4 was the first successful privately funded, liquid-propelled launch vehicle to achieve orbit, and was launched from Omelek Island on 28 September 2008, followed by another Falcon 1 launch on 13 July 2009, placing RazakSAT into orbit.

SpaceX originally planned to upgrade the Omelek launch site for use by the Falcon 9 launch vehicle, but later cancelled their plans to do so, and have since disassembled the entire installation. In December 2010, the SpaceX launch manifest listed Omelek (Kwajalein) as a potential site for several Falcon 9 launches, the first planned for as early as 2012. The "Falcon 9 Overview" document also offered Kwajalein as a launch option in 2010. Since then, the FAA Environmental Impact Report of May 2014 lists this site as non-operational and returned to its original state, to no longer be used, "Five Falcon 1 launches occurred at Omelek Island, Kwajalein Atoll. After these launches of the Falcon 1, the site was no longer needed and SpaceX closed the site and returned the property to pre-launch conditions". All Falcon 1 launches took place at this location, five launches from 2006 to 2009. SpaceX abandoned Omelek when Falcon 1 was retired, due to the expense of logistics.

Suborbital test facilities 
SpaceX has two rocket test facilities for vertical takeoff, vertical landing rockets: the SpaceX Rocket Development and Test Facility in McGregor, Texas and a leased test facility at Spaceport America in southern New Mexico. All SpaceX rocket engines are tested on rocket test stands, and low-altitude VTVL flight testing of the Falcon 9 Grasshopper v1.0 test vehicle are done at McGregor. High-altitude, high-velocity flight testing of Grasshopper v1.1 were planned to be done at Spaceport America. In addition to atmospheric flight testing, and rocket engine testing, the McGregor facility is also used for post-flight disassembly and defueling of the SpaceX Dragon following orbital missions.

Both flight test facilities are principally involved in developing and testing various elements of the SpaceX reusable launch system development program, with a goal to making future SpaceX launch systems fully and rapidly reusable.

SpaceX Rocket Development and Test Facility, McGregor, Texas

SpaceX's Rocket Development and Test Facility in McGregor, Texas is used for research and development of new rocket engines and thrusters as well as for testing final manufactured engines, various components, and engines during development. Although SpaceX manufactures all of their rocket engines and thrusters at their Hawthorne headquarters, each must pass through McGregor where the company tests each new engine off of the assembly line as well as those being developed for future missions to orbit and beyond before each one can be used on a flight mission. "The company's headquarters and factory in ... southern California gets a lot of the attention, but most of the noisy, dirty and critical testing work is done just outside this small central Texas town nestled in amid the farm fields." Extensive and repeated rocket engine testing is a key to increasing reliability and thereby mission success, while lowering operating cost for SpaceX. Dragon spacecraft, following use on a space mission, splashdown and recovery, are shipped to McGregor for de-fueling, cleanup, and refurbishment for potential reuse in flight missions.

In 2003, the company leased the McGregor testing facilities of defunct Beal Aerospace—on land formerly used for the World War II Bluebonnet Ordnance Plant—where it refitted the largest test stand at the facilities for Falcon 9 engine testing. SpaceX has made a number of improvements to the facility since purchase, and has also extended the size of the facility by purchasing several pieces of adjacent farmland. With only three initial employees onsite, the facility grew to over 140 employees by late 2011.

In 2011, the company announced plans to upgrade the facility for launch testing a VTVL rocket, known as Grasshopper, and then constructed a half-acre concrete launch facility in 2012 to support the test flight program. After 8 flights of Grasshopper, and 5 flights of its successor "F9R Dev1" between 2012 and 2014, the FAA permit to fly Grasshopper flight tests in Texas expired in October 2014.

, the McGregor facility consisted of seven test stands operated 18 hours a day, six days a week, and was building more test stands because production was ramping up and the company had a large manifest in the next several years. , the McGregor facility operated 11 test stands involved in the rocket engine test program, and was averaging two tests each day. , the facility comprised , with 12 test stands; it had run over 4000 Merlin engine tests, including some 50 firings of the integrated nine-engine first stage. In May 2016, the McGregor City Council instituted more restrictive rules on rocket engine, rocket stage, and low-altitude flight testing. SpaceX has not commented publicly on how the new rules will affect their testing operations, nor whether they will be evaluating other locations where they might conduct such testing.

The first scaled methane-fueled Raptor rocket engine, manufactured at the Hawthorne facility in California, shipped to McGregor by August 2016 for development testing.

In 2019, SpaceX begin refitting the original vertical test stand at McGregor—previously used for testing Falcon 9 booster stages and second stages starting in the mid-2000s—to be a vertical test stand for Raptor rocket engines to add test capabilities not present in their multiple-bay Raptor test stand.  Rocket engines designed for many uses, tested constantly in horizontal test stands with a gravity gradient orthogonal to the turbine pumps, have somewhat differing wear characteristics on the bearing surfaces which increases wear on startup and shutdown.

In July 2021, SpaceX announced that they would be building a second production facility for Raptor engines, this one at the McGregor  facility.  The Dallas Morning News reported in July that Spacex will "break ground soon" and that the facility will concentrate on the serial production of Raptor 2, while the California facility will produce Raptor Vacuum and new/experimental Raptor designs.  The new facility is expected to eventually produce 800 to 1000 rocket engines each year, approximately 2 to 4 each day.

SpaceX high-altitude test facility, New Mexico
As part of the SpaceX reusable launch system development program, SpaceX announced in May 2013 that the follow up to Grasshopper, a high-altitude, vertical takeoff, vertical landing (VTVL) suborbital technology demonstrator would be tested at Spaceport America near Las Cruces, New Mexico. SpaceX signed a three-year lease for land and facilities at the recently operational spaceport. , SpaceX indicated that they did not yet know how many jobs would move from McGregor, Texas to New Mexico to support the second phase of VTVL Grasshopper testing.

The spaceport administrator expected SpaceX to be operational at the Spaceport between October 2013 and February 2014, and anticipated that the lease payments would begin at that time. Work items have included modifying the Range Operations Plan as well as a variety of fire-prevention measures.

While in July 2014 the first test flight was still expected to occur sometime in 2014, reports in October 2014 indicated that the first flight of F9R Dev2 at Spaceport America would not occur until the first half of 2015. On 19 February 2015, SpaceX announced that the F9R Dev2 would be discontinued indicating that ocean tests using operational Falcon 9 rockets were sufficiently successful that it was no longer necessary. Instead the New Mexico site will be used for testing the returned first stages.

During April 2015, SpaceX performed tanking tests on the In-Flight Abort rocket on the Vandenberg Space Force Base SLC-4E. Since this rocket only possessed three Merlin 1D engines, it was speculated that the discontinued F9R Dev2 was re-purposed as the launch vehicle in the In-Flight Abort Test.

SpaceX Starbase 

Until 2019, SpaceX was building a new spaceport at Boca Chica Village near Brownsville, Texas for their private use, with an emphasis on commercial space transport work. The site is to be optimized for launches of commercial telecommunication satellites that would be launched to the east, across the Gulf of Mexico into geostationary transfer orbits.

During 2011–2014, SpaceX considered as many as seven potential locations around the country for a new private launch facility for orbital flights, including Alaska, California, Florida, Texas, Virginia, Georgia, and Puerto Rico. One of the proposed locations for the new commercial-mission-only spaceport was south Texas, which was revealed in April 2012, via preliminary regulatory documentation. The FAA's Office of Commercial Space Transportation began a multi-year process to conduct an Environmental Impact Statement and public hearings on the new launch site, which would be located in Cameron County, Texas. The site was to initially support up to 12 commercial launches per year, including two Falcon Heavy launches.

As early as March 2013, Texas became the leading candidate for the location of the new SpaceX commercial launch facility, although Florida, Georgia and other locations remained in the running. Legislation was introduced in the Texas Legislature in early 2013 that would enable temporary closings of State beaches during launches, limit liability for noise and some other specific commercial spaceflight risks, while the legislature also considered a package of incentives to encourage SpaceX to locate at the Brownsville, Texas location.
The Texas incentive package and beach closing legislation is in place. In October 2013, CEO Musk said that "Texas is looking increasingly likely," waiting for final regulatory approvals. The FAA released the draft Environmental Impact Statement in April 2013, and "found that 'no impacts would occur' that would force the Federal Aviation Administration to deny SpaceX a permit for rocket operations near Brownsville."

Floating launch platforms

SpaceX is building two floating landing & launch platforms, Phobos and Deimos for their second-generation Starship system. Two deepwater oil rigs were procured in July 2020, and as of 2021, modifications are underway on the two ships in the Port of Brownsville and Port of Galveston.

See also
SpaceX reusable launch system development program
SpaceX Landing Zone

References

{{|title=Elon Musk says SpaceX’s next Texas venture will be a rocket engine factory near Waco |url=https://www.dallasnews.com/business/technology/2021/07/10/elon-musk-says-spacexs-next-texas-venture-will-be-a-rocket-engine-factory-near-waco/ |work=Dallas Morning News |date=10 July 2021 |access-date=11 July 2021}}
 
SpaceX
Kennedy Space Center